Logan is an unincorporated community in Logan County, Nebraska, United States.

History
A post office was established at Logan in 1884, and remained in operation until it was discontinued in 1950. The community of Logan was named from Logan County.

References

Unincorporated communities in Logan County, Nebraska
Unincorporated communities in Nebraska